Ulla Marianna Väistö is Finnish diplomat. She is  serving  as Finland's ambassador to Romania at the Embassy of Bucharest  since September 2011. She is also an  Ambassador to Moldova from Bucharest. Between 2007 and 2011, Väistö  was the ambassador to Mexico, Belize, Haiti and Cuba. By  education she is a Master of Science in Economics.

Väistö  entered the Ministry for Foreign Affairs in 1976. She has worked in embassies in Brussels, Vienna, Bonn and Paris and in Strasbourg at the Finnish Permanent Representation. In the Ministry she was Head of the Administrative Department in 2004-2007 and in 2001-2004 Director of Human Resources

References 

Finnish women diplomats
Ambassadors of Finland to Romania
Ambassadors of Finland to Moldova
Ambassadors of Finland to Mexico
Ambassadors of Finland to Cuba
Ambassadors of Finland to Belize
Ambassadors of Finland to Haiti
Finnish women ambassadors